Tabasaransky District is an administrative and municipal district (raion), one of the forty-one in the Republic of Dagestan, Russia. It is located in the southeast of the republic. Its administrative center is the rural locality (a selo) of Khuchni. As of the 2010 Census, the total population of the district was 52,886, with the population of Khuchni accounting for 6.1% of that number.

Administrative and municipal status
Within the framework of administrative divisions, Tabasaransky District is one of the forty-one in the Republic of Dagestan. The district is divided into eighteen selsoviets which comprise seventy-four rural localities. As a municipal division, the district is incorporated as Tabasaransky Municipal District. Its eighteen selsoviets are incorporated as twenty-two rural settlements within the municipal district. The selo of Khuchni serves as the administrative center of both the administrative and municipal district.

References

Notes

Sources

Districts of Dagestan
